Václav Janoušek is a Czechoslovak retired slalom canoeist who competed in the 1960s. He won two medals at the 1965 ICF Canoe Slalom World Championships in Spittal with a gold in the Mixed C2 event and a silver in the Mixed C2 team event.

References

Czechoslovak male canoeists
Possibly living people
Year of birth missing (living people)
Medalists at the ICF Canoe Slalom World Championships